Willard Lee Nixon (June 17, 1928 – December 10, 2000) was an American pitcher in Major League Baseball who played his entire career with the Boston Red Sox between 1950 and 1958.

The native of Taylorsville, Georgia, signed with the Red Sox as a free agent in 1948 out of Auburn University. In his nine-season career, he posted a 69–72 record with a 4.39 ERA and 616 strikeouts in 225 appearances, including 177 starts, 51 complete games, nine shutouts and three saves. In 1,234 innings pitched he surrendered 1,277 hits and 530 bases on balls.

Nixon was an above average hitting pitcher, posting a .242 batting average (111-for-459) with 42 runs, 2 home runs, 41 RBIs and drawing 42 bases on balls. He was also good defensively, recording a .977 fielding percentage which was 20 points higher than the league average at his position.
 
Nixon had a 12–10 mark with the 1955 Red Sox. Four of those wins came at the expense of the New York Yankees. Although his numbers against the Yanks deteriorated during his final two campaigns ( and ), his previous success—going 11–6 in 25 games pitched—earned him the nickname "Yankee Killer." Over his career, he won half of his 24 decisions, threw ten complete games and two shutouts, and compiled a 3.54 ERA against the Bombers.

Hobbled by a sore arm, Nixon retired from the field after the 1958 season, which he spent between Boston and Triple-A. He scouted for the Red Sox from 1959–1963 before entering private business. He died in Rome, Georgia, at age 72.

References

External links

Baseball Almanac
Historic Baseball
The Deadball Era
Georgia Sports Hall of Fame and Museum

1928 births
2000 deaths
Auburn Tigers baseball players
Baseball players from Georgia (U.S. state)
Birmingham Barons players
Boston Red Sox players
Boston Red Sox scouts
Louisville Colonels (minor league) players
Major League Baseball pitchers
Minneapolis Millers (baseball) players
People from Rome, Georgia
Scranton Red Sox players